The France national football team manager was first established on 25 April 1964 following the appointment of the country's first national football team manager Henri Guérin. Before this, the France national football team was selected by a selection committee, a process in which the French Football Federation would select coaches and trainers from within the country or abroad to prepare the side for single games and tournaments, but with all decisions ultimately remaining under the control of the committee. From 1904–1913, the USFSA headed the committee, which was referred to as the Commission Centrale d'Association. The committee was controlled by André Espir and André Billy and featured little to no physical preparation for upcoming matches. In 1913, the Comité Français Interfédéral, a precursor to the French Football Federation, took over the committee following the USFSA becoming affiliated with the organization and secretary general Henri Delaunay took control.

Following the creation of the French Football Federation, the committee was converted into a five-man board and lasted from 1919–1964. Gaston Barreau served as the head of the committee in two different stints; from 1920–1945, then, after four years, returned to select the team from 1949 until his death in 1958. From 1945–1949, Gabriel Hanot headed the committee and, following Barreau's death, Paul Nicolas (1958–1959) and Georges Verriest (1959–1964) controlled the committee until it was officially disbanded in 1964.

Fifteen men have occupied the post since its inception; three of those were in short-term caretaker manager roles: José Arribas and Jean Snella managed the team in dual roles and presided over four matches and former France international Just Fontaine managed the team for two matches in 1967. The longest tenure by a France national team manager is current manager Didier Deschamps, who has managed the team since 8 July 2012. Four managers have won major tournaments while managing the national team. The first was Michel Hidalgo, who managed the team from 1976–1984, which is the second-longest tenure behind Domenech. Hidalgo won UEFA Euro 1984. In 1998, Aimé Jacquet won the 1998 FIFA World Cup on home soil and, two years later, Roger Lemerre led the team to glory at UEFA Euro 2000. Lemerre also won the 2001 FIFA Confederations Cup. Finally, current manager Didier Deschamps won the 2018 FIFA World Cup in Russia, twenty years after he lifted the trophy as captain. On 8 August 1973, the Romanian Ștefan Kovács became the first foreign manager of the team. During the period of the selection committee, the national team was coached by several British managers. Thomas Griffiths (English) coached the team for a portion of 1924, while Peter Farmer (Scottish) coached the team at the 1928 Summer Olympics. From 1934–1936, the team was coached by Sid Kimpton. The current manager of the France national team is former international Didier Deschamps who replaced fellow international Laurent Blanc following the UEFA Euro 2012 on 8 July 2012.

Statistics
The statistics below detail the managers of the France national football team during their tenure as manager. Though a selection committee was used from 1919–1964, the table details the managerial statistics of the coaches who were under the watch of the selection committee, though the statistics are unofficial as determined by the French Football Federation.

Unofficial managers

Official managers

Managers in italics were hired as caretakers

1Managerial career as head of selection committee. Team was sometimes trained by physical trainers and coached by assistants. Englishman Thomas Griffiths coached the team in 1924, while Scotsman Peter Farmer coached the team at the 1928 Summer Olympics. Englishman Sid Kimpton coached the team for a portion of 1934 and 1935–36.
2Managerial career as head of selection committee. Team was trained by physical trainers Bacquet, Helenio Herrera, and Paul Baron.
3Batteux coached an unofficial France team composed of young players, referred to in France as Espoirs, to an 8–0 victory over Luxembourg in 1953. The match was a qualification match for the 1954 FIFA World Cup. The victory is listed in his 1956–1960 tenure as manager.

References

External links
 

1964 establishments in France
Lists of national association football team managers